Martin Camaj (21 July 1925 – 12 March 1992) was an Albanian folklorist, linguist, and writer. He is regarded as one of the major authors of modern Albanian prose. His novel Rrathë is considered to be the first psychological novel written in Albanian.

Life 
Martin Camaj was born in Temal, Shkodër District, Shkodër County, northwestern Albania on 21 July 1925. He first studied in the Jesuit Saverian College of Shkodër and afterwards in the University of Belgrade. Later Camaj worked as professor of Albanian at the Sapienza University of Rome, where he did postgraduate research and finished studies on linguistics in 1960. In 1957 he became the editor-in-chief of the Albanological journal Shejzat published in Rome. In 1961 he settled in Munich and first worked as a lector at the Ludwig Maximilian University of Munich, while in 1964 he became a Privatdozent. In 1970 he earned his professorship and until 1990 he was a professor of Albanology at the same university. A resident of Lenggries, Bavaria since the 1970s Camaj died there on 12 March 1992.

Works 
Camaj's works revolve around themes like the loss and search for tradition and the loneliness brought by future changes. His first verse collections Nji fyell ndër male (A flute in mountains) and Kanga e Vërrinit (Song of the lowland pastures) were published in Pristina in 1953 and 1954 respectively. His first major prose work was Djella, published in Rome in 1958. His next novel Rrathë (Circles) was published in Munich in 1978. Rrathë, which is Camaj's largest work, took him fifteen years to complete and is regarded as the first psychological novel written in Albanian. The novel is divided in three cycles: water, fire and blood, which symbolize recurrent metaphysical and social themes. In 1981 a collection titled Shkundullima (Quaking) that included five short stories and one play of Camaj was published. His last novel Karpa, which was published in 1987 in Rome, is a dystopian work set in 2238.

Sources 

1925 births
1992 deaths
People from Vau i Dejës
Linguists from Albania
Albanian novelists
Sapienza University of Rome alumni
University of Belgrade Faculty of Philology alumni
Academic staff of the Ludwig Maximilian University of Munich
20th-century novelists
20th-century linguists